Snow White's Poison Bite was a Finnish rock band, formed in Joensuu in 2006.

History
The band was formed in 2006 by Allan Cotterill, Juuso Puhakka, Tuomo Korander and Teemu Leikas. Later, in 2008, the band was completed with bassist Jarkko Penttinen. At the end of 2009, Puhakka left the band due to personal and musical disagreements, ever since the band became a quartet when Cotterill moved on from guitar/clean vocals to lead vocals. Cotterill was born in the UK but has been living in Finland since he was six years old while the rest of the band's members were born and raised in Finland. Cotterill writes all music and lyrics for Snow White's Poison Bite.

In May 2008 SWPB won Big Boom band competition. The prize was three days studio time and a gig at well-known midsummer festival Himos festival. May 2009 SWPB played as an opening act for American post-hardcore band Alesana in Helsinki. They have also been touring with Music Against Drugs -tour in Finland, which is part of the Youth Against Drugs (YAD) organization.

At the beginning of 2009 SWPB signed a contract with Poko Rekords/EMI Finland. In February 2009 Poko released SWPB’s first EP Drama Through Your Stereo.
In early 2010 the band signed a recording contract with Sound Of Finland's Hyeena Trax -label and released two singles, "Valentine's Doom" as free download and "Kristy Killings". 
Their debut album The Story of Kristy Killings, was released on October 27, 2010. The Japanese version of the album was released through Marquee/Avalon and digitally through iTunes in the US.

On May 5, 2011, Tuomo Korander, Jarkko Penttinen and Teemu Leikas announced their departure from the band, forcing them to cancel their remaining tour dates, and leaving Allan Cotterill the only remaining member.

On January 19, 2013 it was announced that the band's Victory Records label debut, Featuring: Dr. Gruesome And The Gruesome Gory Horror Show will be released on April 16.
 The album has received predominantly favorable reviews, stating that the album is packed full of energy and charisma, containing "near pop punk before divulging into massive breakdowns".

The band announced their disbandment on November 11, 2018.

Members

Last lineup
 Allan Cotterill - lead vocals (2009–2018), rhythm guitar (2006–2018), clean vocals (2007-2009)
 Hannu Saarimaa - bass (2012–2018)
 Unknown - guitar (2014–2018)
 Unknown - drums (2014–2018)

Former members
 Andre Rodriguez - drums (2013 USA tour Drummer)
 Niko Hyttinen - drums (Studio drummer)
 Juuso Puhakka - unclean vocals (2007-2009)
 Tuomo Korander - lead guitar (2007-2011)
 Jarkko Penttinen - bass (2007-2011)
 Teemu Leikas - drums (2007-2011)

Discography
Albums
The Story of Kristy Killings (Sound Of Finland, 2010)
Featuring: Dr. Gruesome And The Gruesome Gory Horror Show (Victory Records, April 16, 2013)

EPs
Drama Through Your Stereo EP (Poko Rekords, 2009)

Demos
Snow White’s Poison Bite (self-released, 2008)

Singles
 "So Cinderella" (2008)
 "She's A Trendy Designer on Her Wrists" (2009)
 "Valentine's Doom" (2010)
 "Kristy Killings" (2010)
 "The End Of Prom Night" (2010)
 "Count Dracula Kid" (2012)
 "Gruesome Gory Horror Show" (2013)

Videography
"So Cinderella" (2008)
"She's A Trendy Designer On Her Wrists" (2009)
"The End Of Prom Night" (2010)
"Will You Meet Me In The Graveyard?" (2013)
"There's a New Creep on the Block" (2013)

References

External links
Finnish Newspaper Keskisuomalainen's article on SWPB
Review on The Story Of Kristy Killings at Natalie's World

Finnish musical groups
Finnish rock music groups
Victory Records artists
Musical groups established in 2006
Musical groups disestablished in 2018